This is a list of the presidents of Allegheny College, located in Meadville, Pennsylvania, United States.

Presidents of Allegheny College

 Timothy Alden - 1815–1831
Martin Ruter - 1833–1837
Homer J. Clark - 1837–1847
John Barker - 1847–1860
George Loomis - 1860–1875
Lucius H. Bugbee - 1875–1882
David H. Wheeler  - 1883–1888
Wilbur G. Williams - 1888–1889
David H. Wheeler - 1889–1893
William H. Crawford - 1893–1920
Fred W. Hixson - 1920–1924
James Albert Beebe - 1926–1930
William Pearson Tolley - 1931–1942
John Richie Schultz - 1942–1947
Louis T. Benezet - 1948–1955
Lawrence Lee Pelletier - 1955–1980
David Baily Harned - 1980–1985
Raymond P. Shafer - 1985–1986
Daniel F. Sullivan  - 1986–1996
Richard J. Cook - 1996–2008
James H. Mullen, Jr. - 2008–2019
Hilary L. Link - 2019-Present

References 
 Allegheny College: History & Heritage (list of presidents)
President-Elect Hilary L. Link Press Release

Allegheny College
Allegheny College presidents